Igor Nikolayevich Luzyakin (born 8 December 1968) is a Russian professional football coach and a former player. He is an assistant coach with FC Murom.

External links
 

1968 births
Sportspeople from Oryol
Living people
Soviet footballers
Russian footballers
Association football midfielders
FC Oryol players
CSF Bălți players
FC Spartak-UGP Anapa players
FC Okean Nakhodka players
PFC Krylia Sovetov Samara players
Moldovan Super Liga players
Kazakhstan Premier League players
Russian Premier League players
Russian expatriate footballers
Expatriate footballers in Moldova
Expatriate footballers in Kazakhstan
Russian football managers
FC Oryol managers